Dr. Sunil Patel (born 15 January 1980) is an Indian politician from the state of Uttar Pradesh, of the Apna Dal (Sonelal) party, who is serving as a member of 18th Uttar Pradesh Assembly, from Rohaniya Assembly constituency.

References 

Apna Dal (Sonelal) politicians
Uttar Pradesh MLAs 2022–2027
Members of the Uttar Pradesh Legislative Assembly
1980 births
Living people